Players and pairs who neither have high enough rankings nor receive wild cards may participate in a qualifying tournament held one week before the annual Wimbledon Tennis Championships.

Seeds

  Rameez Junaid /  Philipp Marx (qualifying competition, lucky losers)
  David Martin /  Jean-Claude Scherrer (qualifying competition, lucky losers)
  Mikhail Elgin /  Alexander Kudryavtsev (first round)
  Sanchai Ratiwatana /  Sonchat Ratiwatana (qualifying competition, lucky losers)
  Santiago González /  Travis Rettenmaier (qualified)
  Marco Crugnola /  David Marrero (first round)
  Prakash Amritraj /  Aisam-ul-Haq Qureshi (qualified)
  Sergei Bubka /  Sergiy Stakhovsky (first round)

Qualifiers

  Chris Eaton /  Alexander Slabinsky
  Santiago González /  Travis Rettenmaier
  Kevin Anderson /  Somdev Devvarman
  Prakash Amritraj /  Aisam-ul-Haq Qureshi

Lucky losers

  Rameez Junaid /  Philipp Marx
  David Martin /  Jean-Claude Scherrer
  Alessandro Motti /  Joseph Sirianni
  Sanchai Ratiwatana /  Sonchat Ratiwatana
  Karol Beck /  Jaroslav Levinský
  Chris Guccione /  Frank Moser

Qualifying draw

First qualifier

Second qualifier

Third qualifier

Fourth qualifier

External links

2009 Wimbledon Championships – Men's draws and results at the International Tennis Federation

Men's Doubles Qualifying
Wimbledon Championship by year – Men's doubles qualifying